Trictena argyrosticha is a species of moth of the family Hepialidae. It was described by Turner in 1929, and is endemic to New South Wales and Queensland.

The wingspan is about 100 mm.

The larvae live underground, where they feeds on the roots of various trees, including Casuarina and Eucalyptus species.

References

External links
Hepialidae genera

Moths described in 1929
Hepialidae